Gwynn's Island is an island located in the Chesapeake Bay off of Virginia's Middle Peninsula. The island is located in the northeast part of Mathews County, south of the mouth of the Piankatank River. It is connected to the rest of the county by a swing bridge over Milford Haven. The communities of Gwynn and Grimstead are located on the island.

History
Archeological evidence found on Gwynn's Island indicates that the island was inhabited as early as ten thousand years ago. In 1642, Hugh Gwynn of Jamestown purchased the island; he and his family became the first English settlers there. Gwynn's Island served as a base for Lord Dunmore, the last royal governor of Virginia, after the burning of Norfolk. A smallpox outbreak and attacks by the revolting patriots led Dunmore to leave the island in the summer of 1776.

During the attacks on Gwynn's Island in July 1776, the only casualty on the side of the revolutionaries was one Captain Dohickey Arundel, commander of two eighteen-pound cannons, who attempted to fire an experimental wooden mortar of his own invention, "though the general and all the officers were against his firing it". The mortar exploded on its first shot, killing Arundel instantly.

Present day
Thomas Edwards, a resident of the Island, is the Director of the Gwynn's Island Museum and has been at the helm since 2015.

References

Landforms of Mathews County, Virginia
Virginia islands of the Chesapeake Bay
Tourist attractions in Mathews County, Virginia
American Revolution